Yodlekpet (ยอดเหล็กเพชร) is a Muay Thai fighter known for having an aggressive fight style, despite being usually smaller than the opponents of his weight class.

Career 
In 2018, Yodlekpet was awarded by the muay thai magazine Siam Sports as the best thai boxer of the year.

In November 2018, Yodlekpet Or. Pitisak was ranked the #1 Light weight ranked on Rajadamnern Stadium by muaythai2000.com.

In December 2018, Yodlekpet was ranked #3 Light weight on Lumpinee Stadium by muaythai2000.com.

Yodlekpet faced Silviu Vitez on January 27, 2023, at ONE Friday Fights 2. He won the fight via technical knockout after the doctor stopped the fight due to a cut.

Yodlekpet faced Saman Ashouri on March 17, 2023, at ONE Friday Fights 9. He won the fight via knockout in the second round.

Titles and accomplishments
 KNOCK OUT
 2019 KNOCK OUT Lightweight Asian Tournament Champion 
 2018 KNOCK OUT Lightweight Champion
 Rajadamnern Stadium
 2021 Rajadamnern Stadium 140 lbs Champion
2017 Rajadamnern Stadium 135 lbs Champion
 2015 Rajadamnern Stadium 135 lbs Champion
 Lumpinee Stadium
 2017  Lumpinee Stadium 135 lbs Champion

Awards
 2017 Siam Kela Fighter of the Year

Fight record

|-  style="background:#cfc" 
| 2023-03-17|| Win ||align=left| Saman Ashouri ||  ONE Friday Fights 9, Lumpinee Stadium || Bangkok, Thailand || KO (Punch) || 2 || 0:27
|-  style="background:#cfc"
| 2023-01-27|| Win ||align=left| Silviu Vitez ||  ONE Friday Fights 2, Lumpinee Stadium || Bangkok, Thailand || TKO (Doctor stoppage) || 2 || 2:08	
|-  style="background:#cfc"
| 2022-12-17|| Win ||align=left| Rungkit Bor.Rungrot || Sinbi Stadium || Phuket, Thailand || KO (Low kicks) ||3  || 
|-  style="background:#fbb;"
| 2022-11-18 || Loss ||align=left| Tapaokaew Singmawynn || Ruamponkon + Prachin || Prachinburi province, Thailand || Decision || 5||3:00
|-  style="background:#cfc"
| 2022-10-28|| Win ||align=left| Rungkit Bor.Rungrot || Rajadamnern World Series || Bangkok, Thailand || Decision (Unanimous) ||3  ||3:00 
|-  style="background:#cfc"
| 2022-10-01 || Win||align=left| Kulabdam Sor.Jor.Piek-U-Thai  || Muay Thai Vithee TinThai + Kiatpetch || Buriram province, Thailand ||Decision || 5 || 3:00
|-  style="background:#cfc"
| 2022-08-02 || Win ||align=left| Sangmanee P.K.Saenchaimuaythaigym || Birthday Pitaktham Super Fight || Songkhla province, Thailand || Decision || 5 ||3:00 
|-  style="background:#fbb;"
| 2022-06-29 || Loss||align=left| Kaonar P.K. Saenchai Muaythaigym || Muaythai Palangmai, Rajadamnern Stadium || Bangkok, Thailand || Decision|| 5||3:00 
|-  style="background:#fbb;"
| 2022-04-16||Loss||align=left| Kaonar P.K. Saenchai Muaythaigym ||Pitaktham + Sor.Sommai  || Phayao province, Thailand || Referee stoppage||4  || 
|-  style="background:#c5d2ea;"
| 2022-03-11|| Draw||align=left| Kaonar P.K. Saenchai Muaythaigym || Pitaktham + Sor.Sommai + Palangmai || Songkhla province, Thailand ||Decision || 5 || 3:00 
|-  style="background:#fbb;"
| 2021-12-30|| Loss ||align=left| Kaonar P.K. Saenchai Muaythaigym || Muay Thai SAT Super Fight WiteetinThai || Phuket, Thailand || Decision || 5 || 3:00 
|-  style="background:#cfc"
| 2021-11-26|| Win ||align=left| Kulabdam Sor.Jor.Piek-U-Thai || Muaythai Moradok Kon Thai + Rajadamnern Super Fight || Buriram, Thailand || Decision || 5 || 3:00 
|-
! style=background:white colspan=9 |
|-  style="background:#fbb;"
| 2021-09-18|| Loss ||align=left| Petchmahachon Jitmuangnon	 || Suek Jao Muay Thai, Fonjang Chonburi Stadium  || Chonburi, Thailand || Decision || 5||3:00
|-
! style=background:white colspan=9 |
|-  style="background:#cfc;"
| 2021-04-09|| Win ||align=left| Prabsuek Siopol || Pitaktam, Lumpinee Stadium || Bangkok, Thailand ||KO (Low Kick) ||3 ||
|-  style="background:#fbb;"
| 2021-02-14|| Loss||align=left| Ferrari Fairtex || Channel 7 Stadium|| Bangkok, Thailand ||Decision (Majority) ||5 ||3:00
|-  style="background:#cfc;"
| 2020-11-17|| Win||align=left| Saeksan Or. Kwanmuang || Sor.Sommai, CentralPlaza Nakhon Ratchasima|| Nakhon Ratchasima, Thailand ||Decision ||5 ||3:00
|-  style="background:#fbb;"
| 2020-10-15|| Loss ||align=left| Tapaokaew Singmawynn || Petchaophraya, Rajadamnern Stadium || Bangkok, Thailand || Decision ||5 || 3:00
|-  style="background:#fbb;"
| 2020-09-10|| Loss ||align=left| Rungkit Wor.Sanprapai || Sor.Sommai Birhtday, Rajadamnern Stadium || Bangkok, Thailand || Decision ||5 || 3:00
|-  style="background:#fbb;"
| 2020-07-15|| Loss ||align=left| Kaonar P.K.SaenchaiMuaythaiGym || Rajadamnern Stadium || Bangkok, Thailand || Decision || 5 || 3:00
|-  style="background:#fbb;"
| 2020-01-31|| Loss ||align=left| Rodtang Jitmuangnon || Phuket Super Fight Real Muay Thai || Mueang Phuket District, Thailand || Decision ||5 || 3:00
|-  style="background:#fbb;"
| 2019-12-23||Loss||align=left| Nuenglanlek Jitmuangnon || Rajadamnern Stadium || Bangkok, Thailand ||Decision (Unanimous)|| 5 || 3:00
|-  style="background:#CCFFCC;"
| 2019-11-07|| Win ||align=left| Rafi Bohic|| Ruamponkon Prachin ||Prachinburi, Thailand|| Decision || 5 || 3:00
|-  style="background:#fbb;"
| 2019-08-16|| Loss||align=left| Sangmanee Sor Tienpo ||  || Songkla, Thailand || Decision (Unanimous)|| 5 || 3:00
|-  style="background:#fbb;"
| 2019-07-04|| Loss ||align=left|  Nuenglanlek Jitmuangnon ||Rajadamnern Stadium || Bangkok, Thailand || Decision (Unanimous)|| 5 || 3:00
|-  style="background:#CCFFCC;"
| 2019-04-29 || Win ||align=left| Chan Hyung Lee || KNOCK OUT 2019 SPRING: THE FUTURE IS IN THE RING || Tokyo, Japan || Decision (Unanimous)|| 5 || 3:00
|-
! style=background:white colspan=9 |
|-  style="background:#CCFFCC;"
| 2019-02-11 || Win ||align=left| Altandulguun Boldbaatar || KNOCK OUT 2019 WINTER: THE ANSWER IS IN THE RING || Tokyo, Japan || Decision (Unanimous)|| 5 || 3:00
|-  style="background:#fbb;"
| 2018-12-21|| Loss ||align=left|  Saeksan Or. Kwanmuang ||Rajadamnern Stadium || Bangkok, Thailand || Decision || 5 || 3:00
|-  style="background:#CCFFCC;"
| 2018-11-29|| Win ||align=left| Sangmanee Sor Tienpo || Rajadamnern Stadium || Bangkok, Thailand || Decision || 5 || 3:00
|-  style="background:#CCFFCC;"
| 2018-10-07|| Win ||align=left| Yusuke Iwaki || KNOCK OUT 2018 cross over|| Tokyo, Japan || Decision (Unanimous)|| 5 || 3:00
|-  style="background:#CCFFCC;"
| 2018-08-19|| Win ||align=left| Kazuma Takahashi || KNOCK OUT SUMMER FES.2018 || Tokyo, Japan || Decision (Unanimous)|| 5 || 3:00
|-  style="background:#CCFFCC;"
| 2018-06-28|| Win ||align=left| Sangmanee Sor Tienpo || Rajadamnern Stadium || Bangkok, Thailand || Decision || 5 || 3:00
|-  style="background:#c5d2ea;"
| 2018-05-17|| Draw ||align=left| Yodpanomrung Jitmuangnon || Rajadamnern Stadium || Bangkok, Thailand || Decision || 5 || 3:00
|-  style="background:#CCFFCC;"
| 2018-04-14|| Win ||align=left| Yosuke Morii || KNOCK OUT Sakura Burst || Kawasaki, Japan || TKO (Doctor stoppage/Broken nose)|| 2 || 1:15 
|-
! style=background:white colspan=9 |
|-  style="background:#CCFFCC;"
| 2018-02-20|| Win ||align=left| Panpayak Jitmuangnon  || Onesongchai Fights, Lumpinee Stadium || Bangkok, Thailand || Decision || 5 || 3:00
|-  style="background:#CCFFCC;"
| 2018-01-18|| Win ||align=left| Sangmanee Sor Tienpo || Rajadamnern Stadium || Bangkok, Thailand || Decision || 5 || 3:00
|-  style="background:#CCFFCC;"
| 2017-11-15|| Win ||align=left| Rodlek Jaotalaytong || Rajadamnern Stadium || Bangkok, Thailand || Decision || 5 || 3:00
|-  style="background:#CCFFCC;"
| 2017-09-11|| Win ||align=left| Panpayak Sitjatik || Rajadamnern Stadium || Bangkok, Thailand || KO || 3 ||
|-
! style=background:white colspan=9 |
|-  style="background:#CCFFCC;"
| 2017-06-09|| Win ||align=left| Rambo Phet Tor Tor || Lumpinee Stadium || Bangkok, Thailand || TKO (Referee stop/Punches + Low kicks)|| 4 ||  
|-
! style=background:white colspan=9 |
|-  style="background:#fbb;"
| 2017-05-05 || Loss ||align=left|  Muangthai PKSaenchaimuaythaigym  ||  Lumpinee Stadium || Bangkok, Thailand || Decision || 5 || 3:00
|-  style="background:#CCFFCC;"
| 2017-03-29|| Win ||align=left| Panpayak Sitjatik || Rajadamnern Stadium || Bangkok, Thailand || Decision || 5 || 3:00
|-  style="background:#CCFFCC;"
| 2017-03-02|| Win ||align=left| Phetngam Kiatkumphon || Rajadamnern Stadium || Bangkok, Thailand || KO || 4 ||
|-  style="background:#CCFFCC;"
| 2017-02-02|| Win ||align=left| Bangpleenoi 96Penang || Rajadamnern Stadium || Bangkok, Thailand || KO (Left Body Cross)|| 2 ||
|-  style="background:#fbb;"
| 2016-12-22|| Loss ||align=left|  Saeksan Or. Kwanmuang ||Rajadamnern Stadium || Bangkok, Thailand || Decision || 5 || 3:00
|-  style="background:#fbb;"
| 2016-10-23 || Loss ||align=left| Genji Umeno ||  REBELS.46 || Tokyo, Japan || Decision || 5 || 3:00
|-
! style=background:white colspan=9 |
|-  style="background:#CCFFCC;"
| 2016-09-23|| Win ||align=left|  Panpayak Sitjatik  ||  Lumpinee Stadium || Bangkok, Thailand || KO (Left Knee to the Body)|| 3 ||
|-  style="background:#fbb;"
| 2016-09-02 || Loss ||align=left|  Muangthai PKSaenchaimuaythaigym  ||  Lumpinee Stadium || Bangkok, Thailand || Decision || 5 || 3:00
|-  style="background:#CCFFCC;"
| 2016-08-11 || Win ||align=left| Kaimukkao Por.Thairongruangkamai || Rajadamnern Stadium || Bangkok, Thailand || KO (Left Low Kicks)|| 2 ||
|-  style="background:#CCFFCC;"
| 2016-07-18 || Win ||align=left| Panpayak Sitjatik || Rajadamnern Stadium || Bangkok, Thailand || KO (Right Hook)|| 4 ||
|-  style="background:#fbb;"
| 2016-06-24 || Loss ||align=left|  Kaimukkao Por.Thairongruangkamai ||  Lumpinee Stadium || Bangkok, Thailand || Decision || 5 || 3:00
|-  style="background:#CCFFCC;"
| 2016-05-30 || Win ||align=left| Songkom Nayoksanya || Rajadamnern Stadium || Bangkok, Thailand || Decision || 5 || 3:00
|-  style="background:#CCFFCC;"
| 2016-05-05 || Win ||align=left| Kongsak Saenchaimuaythaigym  || Rajadamnern Stadium || Bangkok, Thailand || Decision || 5 || 3:00
|-  style="background:#fbb;"
| 2016-01-24|| Loss ||align=left| Rodlek Jaotalaytong || Samui Festival || Ko Samui, Thailand || Decision || 5 || 3:00
|-  style="background:#CCFFCC;"
| 2015-12-23 || Win ||align=left| Genji Umeno  || Rajadamnern Stadium || Bangkok, Thailand || TKO (Referee Stoppage/ Left Elbow)|| 3 ||
|-  style="background:#CCFFCC;"
| 2015-11-18 || Win ||align=left| Samingdeat Dekfaifa || Rajadamnern Stadium || Bangkok, Thailand || KO (Right Hook)|| 3 ||
|-
! style=background:white colspan=9 |
|-  style="background:#CCFFCC;"
| 2015-10-22 || Win ||align=left| Chalamtong Sitpanont || Rajadamnern Stadium || Bangkok, Thailand || Decision || 5 || 3:00
|-  style="background:#fbb;"
| 2015-09-10 || Loss ||align=left| Phonek Mor.Phuwana ||  Rajadamnern Stadium || Bangkok, Thailand || Decision || 5 || 3:00
|-  style="background:#CCFFCC;"
| 2015-07-15 || Win ||align=left| Kiatphet Peakmai Restaurant || Rajadamnern Stadium || Bangkok, Thailand || Decision || 5 || 3:00
|-  style="background:#fbb;"
| 2015-03-06 || Loss ||align=left|  Aranchai Kiatpataraphan  ||  Lumpinee Stadium || Bangkok, Thailand || Decision || 5 || 3:00
|-  style="background:#fbb;"
| 2014-11-07 || Loss ||align=left|  Auisiewpor Sujibamikiew  ||  Lumpinee Stadium || Bangkok, Thailand || Decision || 5 || 3:00
|-  style="background:#CCFFCC;"
| 2014-09-25 || Win ||align=left| Por.Tor.Thor. Petchrungruang ||  Rajadamnern Stadium || Bangkok, Thailand || Decision || 5 || 3:00
|-  style="background:#CCFFCC;"
| 2014-08-25 || Win ||align=left| Eakrit Mor.kungteptonburi ||  Lumpinee Stadium || Bangkok, Thailand || Decision || 5 || 3:00
|-
| colspan=9 | Legend:

References

Yodlekpet Or. Pitisak
Living people
1994 births